The Brittany Murphy Story is a 2014 American biographical drama television film about actress Brittany Murphy. It aired on Lifetime on September 6, 2014.

Synopsis 
The film tells the story of Brittany Murphy, from her rise in the 1990s in Hollywood, her relationship with actor Ashton Kutcher in the early 2000s, her problems with fame and self-esteem, to her mysterious death on December 20, 2009 at the age of 32.

Cast
 Amanda Fuller as Brittany Murphy
 Sherilyn Fenn as Sharon Murphy
 Eric Petersen as Simon Monjack
 Chloë Crampton as Morgan
 Adam Hagenbuch as Ashton Kutcher

References

External links
 

2014 television films
2014 films
2014 biographical drama films
2010s American films
2010s English-language films
American biographical drama films
American drama television films
Biographical films about actors
Biographical television films
Lifetime (TV network) films